Patrick Jonathan Lambie (born 17 October 1990) is a retired South African professional rugby union player who last played for  in the French Top 14. He announced his retirement in January 2019 due to multiple concussions.

Early life
Lambie attended school at Clifton Preparatory in Durban before attending Michaelhouse from 2004 to 2008. He played SA schools rugby in both grade 11 and matric (grade 12). He was head boy and captained both the rugby and cricket team in his final year at Michaelhouse. He also holds a British passport.

Career
Lambie is capable of playing flyhalf, centre and fullback, and was the leading points scorer in the 2009 ABSA U21 Currie Cup despite only turning 19 later that year. He represented South Africa at the under-20 level when he was selected for the squad, and was utilized extensively as the first choice fullback during the 2010 U20 World Cup in Argentina.

Lambie joined the Sharks senior team set up in the 2010 Super 14 season, where his debut was spent in the fullback position. He was shifted to centre in the 2010 Currie Cup and due to injury was required to fill the flyhalf berth. Due to his natural talent and unwavering nerve he made the position his own and was integral in helping the Sharks reach Currie Cup success in 2010, including scoring two tries, three conversions and three penalties in the Sharks' 30–10 win over Western Province in the final of the tournament. He was awarded with the "Man-of-the-Match" award in the Currie Cup final. Lambie was also the second highest point scorer in the Currie Cup.

Lambie was called up to represent  during their 2010 tour to Ireland and the United Kingdom. He made his début against  on 6 November 2010, at flyhalf after Morné Steyn was substituted in the second half. He converted a try on his debut. He has also started against the Barbarians team for the Springboks at fullback, but this was not an official international match.

School career
Lambie was not a prodigious rugby player during his Clifton Preparatory School years, but he came into his own while attending Michaelhouse school. He played in the highest level teams in all of the under-14, under-15 and under-16 age groups at Michaelhouse. He suffered an elbow injury in his 2006-year which sidelined him for most of the season. In 2007, Lambie made the Michaelhouse first team as fullback and went on to play for both KZN at Craven Week and S.A. Schools. In 2008, Lambie became headboy of Michaelhouse and was elected both first team rugby and cricket captain. In 2008, Lambie once again made the KZN Craven week and S.A. Schools sides. Lambie attained more than an 80% win rate with his two years of Michaelhouse's first team, and never lost in any sport to Hilton which is Michaelhouse's "rival" school. While Lambie played in the Michaelhouse first rugby team they were ranked in the top ten rugby schools in the country. Lambie was both the KZN cricket and KZN Craven Week captain, and was Michaelhouse's first Springbok rugby player in their 115-year history.

2009 season
Lambie had a successful season in 2009 for the Sharks under-21 team, even though he only turned 19 years old in October that year. Lambie played at the fullback position for the U21 Sharks. Lambie scored a personal haul of 192 points in the competition and ended the season as the U21 Currie Cup top points scorer. Lambie narrowly lost the U21 ABSA Currie Cup final against U21 Free State Cheetahs. He made one appearance for the Sharks senior side in the 2009 Currie Cup against the GWK Griquas at centre. Lambie made his debut in the last twenty minutes of the match.

2010 season
Lambie made his debut for the Sharks against The Highlanders at fullback on 18 March. His debut coincided with the end of the Sharks five game losing streak. He went on to start the next seven consecutive games (losing only one match against the champion Bulls which ended their five-match winning streak) for the Sharks and scoring two tries in the process. Lambie then played for the South African under-20 team in the 2010 IRB Junior World Championship in Argentina. He played fullback for all of the games and ended up as the tournaments second top scorer (behind Tyler Bleyendaal). South Africa ended third in the competition.

He started the campaign at fullback but moved to inside centre and finally flyhalf where he would remain for the rest of the campaign. Lambie scored 205 points in 16 games and ended up the second highest scorer (behind Willem de Waal) in the competition. He played in all sixteen of the Sharks' matches coming off the bench in just one of them. In 2010 he played 24 matches for the Sharks, winning 19 of them and scoring a total of 215 points in all competitions for the Sharks.

2011 season
Lambie started the 2011 Super Rugby season playing against the Cheetahs in a South African derby. Lambie converted a try and slotted three penalties, scoring eleven points in the process. Lambie's second match was against the Blues. He scored a try and converted four penalties and two tries scoring nineteen points in the process, he was awarded a Man-of-the-Match for his contribution. Although Lambie put in a perfect kicking performance in his fifth match of the season against the Chiefs the Sharks lost 15–9. Lambie broke his finger in the match and was sidelined for the next three matches, the only he had missed since his debut.

He came back strongly from his injury and propelled the Sharks from their dismal form, which included two losses after his departure, he then led them to 6th place on the Super Rugby log only nine points behind the Reds. He finished fourth on the point scorers chart with 193 points which included four tries in his first full season of Super Rugby. Lambie broke the Sharks record for most points scored in a season by an individual player. The Sharks made it to the Super Rugby playoffs, but lost to the Crusaders with Lambie kicking all the penalties and conversions. His success and brilliant play in the Super Rugby season earned him a place in the preliminary Springbok squad for the 2011 Rugby World Cup.

He made two more appearances for the Springboks in 2011 during the Tri-nations and earned his first start on 30 July at fly-half against New Zealand. During the 2011 Rugby World Cup Lambie started in the fullback berth for all the group stage games and for the quarter final match. Lambie had a try disallowed during the Springbok quarter final loss against the Australian team 11–9.

Lambie then returned to South Africa and played against the MTN Lions in the Currie Cup.

2012 season

Sharks games
The Sharks began the 2012 Super Rugby season campaign against their local rivals the Vodacom Bulls. They lost a closely contested match up 18–13 with Lambie converting a try and scoring two penalties. The next weekend the Sharks would suffer a 15–12 loss to the DHL Stormers with Lambie once again scoring the majority of his team's points. Lambie scored 39 points in these games. The Sharks then played another 6 games and won 4 of them mainly due to Lambie scoring 89 points in the five games he played, missing one match due to concussion. Lambie recovered from his concussion and returned to action against the Blues and scored 9 points in a tight match. He would however return to play against the Chiefs in the final of the tournament although he would have little impact as the Sharks lost 37–6 to a strong Chiefs side. Lambie played 13 games during the 2012 Super Rugby season, scoring 141 points as he averaged 11 points a game.

Lambie only played three matches during the 2012 Currie Cup Tournament for the Sharks due to his international commitments for the South African National team. He set up 3 tries and scored 17 points as the Sharks continued their form going into the semi-final, Lambie was also awarded the Man-of-the-Match award for his performance. Lambie would then start for the Sharks against the Vodacom Blue Bulls in the semi-final and his form would continue as he scored 15 points from 5 penalties to once again win the Man-of-the-Match award and to send the Sharks to the final of the Currie Cup. The Sharks would narrowly lose 25–18 in a closely knit match with Lambie scoring all 18 points in the game with 6 penalties. Lambie finished the Currie Cup campaign with 50 points in 3 games and was selected for the South African National Team's Northern Hemisphere tour at the end of the year.

Springbok matches
Lambie's all round play and his position of fifth on the super rugby point scorer's table got him selected for the Springbok squad for the 2012 England tour of South Africa. He took the pitch at half time with the score at 6–6 and helped the Springboks to a 22–17 victory over England. This was his twelfth cap. On 4 October 2014 Lambie scored the winning penalty against The All Blacks which ended their 22 match unbeaten run.

He was selected as Springbok reserve fullback for The Castle Rugby Championship 2012, but was kept warming the bench in favour of the regular full back, Zane Kirchner, during the two matches against Argentina in August 2012. On 6 October 2012 he played as reserve fullback (taking the field at the 64th minute into the game) versus New Zealand at the FNB Stadium, Soweto at the age of only 21.

He was selected as Springbok fly-half and goal kicker for the outgoing overseas tour to Britain and Ireland during November 2012, coincidentally scoring 11 points (3 penalties and one conversion) in each of the three tests giving him a grand total of 33 points on the tour.

Lambie was recognised for his consistent and exceptional play in the 2012 season by being nominated for SARU Player of the year.

Retirement
Lambie announced his retirement from rugby on 19 January 2019 due to multiple concussions in his career.

Honours

Currie Cup: 2010
Currie Cup: 2013

Accolades
SARU Young Player of the Year 2011
South African Team of the year 2012

References

External links
Sharks Profile

Genslin Springbok stats
itsrugby.co.uk Profile

1990 births
Living people
Barbarian F.C. players
Rugby union fly-halves
Rugby union fullbacks
Rugby union players from Durban
Sharks (Currie Cup) players
Sharks (rugby union) players
South Africa international rugby union players
South Africa Under-20 international rugby union players
South African people of British descent
South African people of Scottish descent
South African rugby union players
White South African people
Alumni of Michaelhouse